Charlestown railway station served the town of Charlestown, Fife, Scotland from 1894 to 1926 on the Kincardine Line.

History 
The station opened on 1 September 1894. It was on the shoreline and west of Limekilns. It closed to passengers on 1 November 1926.

References

External links 

Disused railway stations in Fife
Railway stations in Great Britain opened in 1894
Railway stations in Great Britain closed in 1926
Former North British Railway stations
1894 establishments in Scotland
1926 disestablishments in Scotland